Defeated Creek is an unincorporated community in Letcher County, Kentucky, in the United States.

History
A post office was established at Defeated Creek in 1909, and remained in operation until it was discontinued in 1943.

See also
 Defeated Creek (Letcher County, Kentucky), a stream

References

Unincorporated communities in Letcher County, Kentucky
Unincorporated communities in Kentucky